Carlidnack (or Carlinack) is a hamlet in the parish of Mawnan, Cornwall, England.

There is evidence of an ancient settlement at Carlidnack called a round that dates back to the late Iron Age or Roman period. This is a scheduled ancient monument that has been listed by English Heritage. The round is a circular area enclosed by a bank of earth and a ditch and with a single entrance; a round is usually a sign of an agricultural settlement.

References

Hamlets in Cornwall
Mawnan